is a district of Nerima, Tokyo, Japan. It is located around 1.5 kilometers north of Ōizumi-gakuen Station of Seibu Railway Seibu Ikebukuro Line and consists of nine chōme.

The district is colloquially simply called Ōizumigakuen. However, the simplified term is often used to refer to the greater Ōizumi area also encompassing Ōizumimachi (大泉町), Nishiōizumi (西大泉), Nishiōizumimachi (西大泉町), Higashiōizumi (東大泉) and Minamiōizumi (南大泉).

Historically, the main industry of the Ōizumi area was agriculture. But after the establishment of Higashi Ōizumi Station (now Ōizumi-gakuen Station) in 1924, its surrounding area saw a great development as a commercial neighborhood and, consequently, Ōizumigakuenchō grew to be a quiet residential neighborhood for a number of upper-income earners.

Notable people from Ōizumigakuenchō
 Natsuki Ozawa, Japanese singer, actress and AV actress

Neighborhoods of Tokyo
Nerima